Kincheloe is an unincorporated community and census-designated place (CDP) in Chippewa County on the Upper Peninsula of the U.S. state of Michigan, named after the former Kincheloe Air Force Base, that was in turn named after noted pilot Iven Kincheloe.

It is on the area formerly occupied by the Kincheloe Air Force Base, which covered .

Despite the loss of approximately 10,000 personnel living in the area after the base closure in 1977, the town has managed to survive the years since closing, largely due to the development of several prisons in the area, some growth in light industry and an airport that continues to use some of the runways built for the Air Force Base.

Chippewa County International Airport, Kinross Correctional Facility, Chippewa Correctional Facility, Kinross Manufacturing, American Kinross, Inc. are now located on the base's former property and adjacent land. In all, the local tax base had doubled, and the civilian payroll created by the new ventures had reached $110 million.

The town is also home to The Oaks at Kincheloe, formerly The Kincheloe Memorial Golf Course, an 18-hole, par 72,  course built as a nine-hole course by the base in 1951 and expanded in 1987.

Demographics

Major highways

References

External links
Kinross Township

Census-designated places in Michigan
Census-designated places in Chippewa County, Michigan
Unincorporated communities in Michigan
Unincorporated communities in Chippewa County, Michigan